Sir Charles Herbert Sheffield, 1st Baronet (c. 1706–1774) of Normanby, Lincolnshire, England, was an illegitimate son of John Sheffield, 1st Duke of Buckingham and Normanby and the first of the Sheffield baronets, and the owner of Buckingham Palace (then known as Buckingham House) who sold it to King George III.

Biography
Sheffield, baptised Charles Herbert, was an illegitimate son of John Sheffield, 1st Duke of Buckingham and Normanby, and Frances Stewart, who, then or afterwards, was the wife of The Hon. Oliver Lambart, younger son of Charles Lambart, 3rd Earl of Cavan.

Sheffield was probably born about 1706 (when his mother was 22 years old, was "under the tuition of Mons. Brezy, at Utretcht", in August 1716, and took the name of Sheffield, instead of Herbert. He inherited, on the death, 30 October 1735, of the 2nd and last Duke (at his age of 19), the considerable estates of both of these Dukes, in Lincolnshire and elsewhere. He was created a baronet on 1 March 1755. He died 5 September 1774.

Family
On 25 April 1741, Sheffield married Margaret Diana, daughter of General Joseph Sabine, sometime Governor of Ghent and Gibraltar. She died on 7 January 1762, in Buckingham House, St James's Park, which shortly afterwards was sold by her husband for £21,000 to King George III.

Notes

References

1700s births
1774 deaths
Year of birth uncertain
18th-century English people

Baronets in the Baronetage of Great Britain
Buckingham Palace
Charles